A back door is a door in the rear of a building.  Back door may also refer to:

Arts and media
 Back Door (jazz trio), a British group
 Porta dos Fundos (literally “Back Door” in Portuguese) Brazilian comedy YouTube channel. 
 Works so titled: 
 The Back Door (fiction), a 1897 work serialised in Hong Kong
 "Back Door", a 1969 sound single by Rhinoceros (band) 
 Musical albums:
 Back Door (album), a 1972 by English jazz trio Back Door
 The Back Door (album), a 1992 album by American band Cherish the Ladies
 Songs:
 "Backdoor" (song), a 2020 song by American rapper Lil Durk
 "Back Door", a 2021 song by American rapper Pop Smoke from the album Faith

Other uses
 Backdoor (computing), a hidden method for bypassing normal computer authentication systems
 Backdoor (basketball), a play in which a player gets behind the defense and receives a pass for an easy score
 Backdoor Bay, Ross Island, Antarctica
 Slang for the human anus

See also
 Backdoor pilot, the use of existing series in assessing potential audience reaction to a proposed television series
 Backdoor breaking ball, a type of pitch
 Backdoor.Win32.IRCBot, a computer worm
 Music:
 Backdoor progression, in music theory, characteristic harmonic device used in many "jazz standards"
 Works:
 "Back Door Man", a 1960 blues song, written by Willie Dixon & recorded by Howlin' Wolf
 "Back Door Santa", a 1968 blues song written by Clarence Carter and Marcus Daniel
"Lookin' out My Back Door", a rock song by Creedence Clearwater Revival, on their 1970 album Cosmo's Factory